Taking the Falls was a Canadian dramedy series, which aired on CTV in the 1995-96 television season.

The show starred Cynthia Dale as Terry Lane, a former police officer turned private investigator in Niagara Falls who solved crimes with the help of her lawyer friend Katherine MacVicar (Sandra Nelson). The cast also included Alex Carter and Michael Copeman as police associates of Lane's.

Dale's sister Jennifer Dale also appeared in one episode of the show as Gloria, a flaky psychic. The show was not renewed for a second season.

References

External links

1990s Canadian comedy-drama television series
1990s Canadian crime drama television series
1995 Canadian television series debuts
1996 Canadian television series endings
CTV Television Network original programming
Niagara Falls in fiction
Television shows set in Ontario